Zofia Odrowąż (1537–1580) was a Polish noblewoman.
She was the daughter of castellan and voivode Stanisław Odrowąż and only daughter of Anna of Masovia, last Masovian duchess of the Piast dynasty, and became the widow of the castellan of Wojnicz and castellan of Sandomierz.
She married firstly, Hetman Jan Krzysztof Tarnowski and secondly, castellan and voivode Jan Kostka in 1569.

Life

Shortly before 9 November 1555 she became the wife of Jan Krzysztof Tarnowski (1537–1567). After his death, late in 1574 she married Jan Kostka. With him, she had three surviving children:
 Jan Kostka
 Anna Ostrogska
 Katarzyna Sieniawska

References 

1537 births
1580 deaths
Zofia